Lukács Egri (b. Wittenberg) was a German-Hungarian Unitarian who published De controversis fidei questionibus adversus dogmata Calvini… in 1567.

His teaching was condemned by  Confessio Cassoviensis, adopted in Košice in 1568.

References

Hungarian Unitarians
1574 deaths